Michael Nicholas  (30 July 1946) is the President of Wales Rugby League. He is a Welsh former rugby union and professional rugby league footballer who played in the 1970s and 1980s, and has coached or been the team manager of the Wales Rugby League team since the 1980s. He played club level rugby union (RU) for Aberavon. In rugby league (RL) he played for Warrington, and the Cardiff Blue Dragons, and at representative Rugby League level for Wales and Great Britain. He played as a Front Row forward or Second Row, i.e. numbers 8, 10, 11 or 12, during the era of contested scrums.

Playing career

International honours
Mike Nicholas won caps for Wales while at Warrington in 1975 against France and England, in 1977 against England and France, in 1978 against France, and in 1979 against England. He also represented Great Britain in non-Test Matches.

Challenge Cup Final appearances
Mike Nicholas played left-, i.e. number 11, in Warrington's 24–9 victory over Featherstone Rovers in the 1974 Challenge Cup Final during the 1973–74 season at Wembley Stadium, London on Saturday 11 May 1974, in front of a crowd of 77,400, and played as an interchange/substitute, i.e. number 15, (replacing Right- Thomas Martyn) in the 7–14 defeat by Widnes in the 1975 Challenge Cup Final during the 1974–75 season at Wembley Stadium, London on Saturday 10 May 1975, in front of a crowd of 85,998.

BBC2 Floodlit Trophy Final appearances
Mike Nicholas did not play (Tommy Conroy played right-) in Warrington's 0–0 draw with Salford in the 1974 BBC2 Floodlit Trophy Final during the 1974–75 season at The Willows, Salford on Tuesday 17 December 1974, and played right-, i.e. number 12, (replaced by interchange/substitute Brian Brady) in the 5–10 defeat by Salford in the 1974 BBC2 Floodlit Trophy Final replay during the 1974–75 season at Wilderspool Stadium, Warrington on Tuesday 28 January 1975.

Player's No.6/John Player Trophy Final appearances
Mike Nicholas played as an interchange/substitute, i.e. number 15, (replacing  David Chisnall), and scored a try in Warrington's 27–16 victory over Rochdale Hornets in the 1973–74 Player's No.6 Trophy Final during the 1973–74 season at Central Park, Wigan on Saturday 9 February 1974, played right-, i.e. number 10, in the 9–4 victory over Widnes in the 1977–78 Players No.6 Trophy Final during the 1977–78 season at Knowsley Road, St. Helens on Saturday 28 January 1978, and played right-, i.e. number 10, in the 14–16 defeat by Widnes in the 1978–79 John Player Trophy Final during the 1977–78 season at Knowsley Road, St. Helens on Saturday 28 April 1979.

Notable tour matches
Mike Nicholas played as a front-rower in Warrington's 15–12 victory over Australia at Wilderspool Stadium, Warrington on Wednesday 11 October 1978.

Club career
Mike Nicholas was sent off 13-times for Warrington.

Coaching career
Mike Nicholas was team manager of Wales at the 2000 Rugby League World Cup.

Nicholas was appointed Member of the Order of the British Empire (MBE) in the 2020 New Year Honours for services to rugby league in Wales.

References

External links
(archived by web.archive.org) Mike Nicholas at eraofthebiff.com
(archived by web.archive.org) Ray French's Wales team profile 2000 Rugby League World Cup
Wales target Aussie shock
Welsh club could win pro call-up
Rowley named Wales League chief
Lockyer pleased with warm-up win
Hammond hammer blow for Wales
Super League Crusaders' move 'can help save Wrexham'
New Zealand crush battling Wales
Hammond hammer blow for Wales
New Zealand crush battling Wales
League set for five nations
Kelly appointed Wales coach
Statistics at wolvesplayers.thisiswarrington.co.uk

1946 births
Living people
Aberavon RFC players
Footballers who switched code
Members of the Order of the British Empire
Rugby league players from Port Talbot
Rugby league props
Rugby union players from Port Talbot
Wales national rugby league team players
Warrington Wolves players
Welsh rugby league coaches
Welsh rugby league players
Welsh rugby union players